The Stock Judging Pavilion is a historic building located in Oskaloosa, Iowa, United States.  The facility on the Southern Iowa Fairgrounds was built in 1919 by P.W. Sparks, a prominent local contractor.  It is believed he designed the building as well.  It is one of several structures built at the grounds around the same time.  In 1919 the Southern Iowa Fair was the second largest fair in the state after the Iowa State Fair.  The pavilion originally had a double monitor roof.  The upper monitor was removed sometime before 1945.  The building was listed on the National Register of Historic Places in 1984.

References

Buildings and structures completed in 1919
Oskaloosa, Iowa
Tourist attractions in Mahaska County, Iowa
Buildings and structures in Mahaska County, Iowa
National Register of Historic Places in Mahaska County, Iowa